Nadia Natacha Podoroska (born 10 February 1997) is an Argentine professional tennis player. She competed at the 2020 Summer Olympics.

Podoroska has won one doubles title on the WTA Tour and one singles title on the WTA Challenger Tour along with 14 singles titles and seven doubles titles on the ITF Circuit. On 12 July 2021, she reached her best singles ranking of world No. 36, and on 18 October 2021, she peaked at No. 62 in the WTA doubles rankings.

Early life
Podoroska was born on February 10, 1997, in Rosario, Santa Fe Province, and grew up in a middle-class family in Fisherton, a neighborhood founded in the late 1880s by railroad workers. She is one of three children born to father Marcelo and mother Irene; she is of Ukrainian descent as her grandparents were Ukrainian, but she does not speak the language at all. Her father was a watchmaker by profession who over the years became a pharmacist, and her mother is also a pharmacist. Nadia was the first in her family to play tennis, a sport that she began practicing at the Fisherton Athletic Club at age five. As a child, she followed the performances of the Argentine male tennis players, especially Guillermo Cañas, although not so much of the national female representatives because they were broadcast infrequently on television. Among the female tennis players, she admired the Williams sisters.

Her first years on the circuit were complicated due to financial difficulties competing internationally. In late 2017, she suffered several injuries that jeopardized her career. Upon her return, she decided to live in Alicante, Spain to settle in Europe and have greater chances of competing weekly. In addition, she began to be trained by Juan Pablo Guzmán and Emiliano Redondi. She added Pedro Merani to her team, with whom she performs mental training based on bompu zen and neuroscience, an aspect that she considered important to change her attitude towards tennis and its matches.

Professional career

2020: French Open singles semifinal, top 50 & Newcomer of the Year
In October, Podoroska became the first qualifier to reach the semifinals of the French Open when she beat third seed Elina Svitolina in the quarterfinals at Roland Garros. Podoroska was named the WTA Newcomer of the Year for her rankings achievement and her solid performance throughout the season.

2021–22: French Open SF in doubles, top 40 in singles & Olympics debut
She continued her good form when she reached the quarterfinals of the Yarra Valley Classic by defeating fourth-seeded Petra Kvitová.

In May, at the Italian Open, she defeated 23 times Grand Slam champion and eighth-seeded Serena Williams in the second round. This was her third top-ten win in the last eight months. Williams was playing her 1000th match of her career.

At the French Open, Podoroska lost in the first round to tenth seed Belinda Bencic but reached the semifinals in doubles, partnering with Irina-Camelia Begu for the first time. As a result, she reached the top 40 in singles and No. 69 in doubles for the first time in her career on 14 June 2021.

At the end of the year, following the 2021 US Open, Podoroska announced she was withdrawing from the 2022 Australian Open due to struggles with pain that hit her through the whole season, opting to rest and recover until March 2022.

She returned to competition in June 2022 after ten months of inactivity to participate in the Wimbledon qualifying, where she reached the second round.

National representation
Playing for the Argentina Fed Cup team, Podoroska has a win–loss record of 12–8.

She qualified to represent Argentina at the 2020 Summer Olympics in Tokyo and won against Yulia Putintseva, who played for Kazakhstan, by retirement to reach the second round, and Russian Ekaterina Alexandrova to reach the third round. Podoroska became the first Argentine woman to reach the round of 16 in Olympic tennis in the 21st century in singles. Only two Argentine female players reached it 25 years ago, Gabriella Sabatini and Inés Gorrochategui in 1996 at Atlanta.

Personal life
Podoroska lives and trains in Alicante, Spain.

In 2022, Podoroska came out as a lesbian, posting her pictures on Instagram with her girlfriend, fellow Argentinian tennis player, Guillermina Naya. She confirmed their relationship in an interview with ClayTenis.com.

Performance timelines

Only main-draw results in WTA Tour, Grand Slam tournaments, Fed Cup/Billie Jean King Cup and Olympic Games are included in win–loss records.

Singles
Current after the 2023 Merida Open.

Doubles
Current after the 2023 Australian Open.

WTA career finals

Doubles: 2 (1 title, 1 runner-up)

WTA Challenger finals

Singles: 1 (title)

Doubles: 1 (runner-up)

ITF Circuit finals

Singles: 17 (14 titles, 3 runner–ups)

Doubles: 11 (7 titles, 4 runner–ups)

Head-to-head record

Top 10 wins

Notes

References

External links
 
 
 
 
 
 

1997 births
Living people
Sportspeople from Rosario, Santa Fe
Argentine female tennis players
Argentine people of Ukrainian descent
Pan American Games medalists in tennis
Pan American Games gold medalists for Argentina
Tennis players at the 2019 Pan American Games
Medalists at the 2019 Pan American Games
Olympic tennis players of Argentina
Tennis players at the 2020 Summer Olympics
Argentine LGBT sportspeople
Argentine lesbians
LGBT tennis players
21st-century LGBT people
Lesbian sportswomen